Giorgi Romanovich Maysuradze (born 9 December 1991) is a Georgian football player. He also holds Russian citizenship.

He made his professional debut in the Russian Professional Football League for FC Sochi on 26 August 2014 in a game against FC TSK Simferopol.

References

External links
 Career summary by sportbox.ru

1991 births
Living people
Footballers from Georgia (country)
FC Sioni Bolnisi players
FC Lokomotivi Tbilisi players
Association football midfielders